is a Japanese manga series written by Marginal and illustrated by Takeya Syuji. It began serialization in 2005 issue of the monthly seinen manga magazine Comic Beam.  It was published in English by CMX Manga, in French by Casterman, in German by Carlsen Manga, and in Portuguese by Panini Comics.

Reception
Ed Sizemore found the art in the first part of the first volume distracting, and the lead character to be unsympathetic.  However, he felt that the manga was well written. Deb Aoki described the manga as a "glass onion of a mystery". Katherine Dacey found the story "immersive".

References

External links
 

CMX (comics) titles
Enterbrain manga
Mystery anime and manga
Seinen manga
Supernatural anime and manga